Loudness Clarifies/Electronic Music From Tapelab is a double album by Jack Dangers. Disc two compiles ten years worth of Jack's experimental musique concrète tape work and is a selection of electro-acoustic works recorded between 1993–2003 for film, radio and television. Disc one is similar to Dangers' work with Meat Beat Manifesto.

Track listing

CD 1: "Loudness Clarifies"
"Annihilating Rhythm" - 6:38
Flange effects by: David Wright
"Musical Experiences" - 4:09
"Individual 1" - 4:05
"Individual 2" - 4:34
"Listen For The Echo" - 3:53
"Boss Society?" - 4:36
Bass by: David Wright
"Encoder" - 2:56
"Super Hit 9" - 4:35
Drums by: Jon Drukman
"Solid Gold" - 4:29
"Servile Days" - 1:56
"Granulation-2" - 3:04
"The Aeolian Arp" - 7:03

CD 2: "Electronic Music From Tapelab"
 4:42
 7:47
 2:30
 7:23
 4:18
 2:30
 3:40
 6:25
 4:24
 7:00

References

Jack Dangers albums
Important Records albums